The Zeme people, also known as the Zeme Nagas, are a Tibeto-Burmese ethnic group from Northeast India. Their villages are mostly spread across Peren district in Nagaland; Tamenglong district, Senapati district in Manipur and Dima Hasao district (NC hills) in Assam.

Notable people
 Armstrong Pame, after his graduation from St.Stephen's college, Delhi in Physics. He wrote UPSC exam and was allocated IAS in 2009. While serving as SDM in Tousem subdivision, Tamenglong district, Manipur. He built 100 km road without Govt fund.
 TR Zeliang was a two time Chief Minister of Nagaland
 L Lungalang, Former Chief Secretary of Nagaland
 N.N. Haralu, Former Indian Ambassador, She served in various capacities in the Ministry of External affair and Indian Foreign Service and retired in 1980 as she reached the pinnacle of her career as an Ambassador of Panama.
 Dr. Harielungbe Haralu, First Naga Medical Doctor.
 Nini Lungalang, Poet

Bibliography 
 Roy, Babul and A.N.M.I. Ali. "Shifting cultivation and forest in North East India", People of the Himalayas: Ecology, Culture, Development and Change by K. C. Mahanta, Kamla-Raj Enterprises: Delhi (1997).
 Roy, Babul. Socio-cultural and environmental dimensions of tribal health: a study among the Dimasa Kacharis and the Zemi Nagas of North Cachar Hills in Assam. PhD Thesis (unpublished), Gauhati University, Assam (1998).
 Roy, Babul. An anthropological peep at Zeme religion. Bull. Dept. Anth. Gauhati University, IX, 51-60 (1995).
 Roy, Babul. Folk Medicine and Folk Therapeutic Principle among the Zeme Nagas of N. C. Hills in Assam (India) Curare: Journal of Ethnomedicine and Transcultural Psychiatry [Germany] Sole 2001, Vol. 24, No. 1 & 2, pages 161-164. Refereed  Int.
 Roy, Babul. Zeme Naga Ethno-medicines and animal related practices. Curare: Journal of Medical Anthropology [Germany]. Sole 2010, Vol.33, No.1+2, pages 97–104. Refereed  Int.
 Roy, Babul. Evolving Gender Relationships among the Zeme Nagas of North Cachar Hills (Assam). Journal of Indian Anthropological Society [India] Sole 2004, Vol. 38, pages 9–20. Refereed  Nat.
 Roy, Babul. Folk Perception of Disease and Curative Measures among the Zeme Nagas of North Cachar Hills in Assam. Journal of Indian Anthropological Society [India] Sole 2004, Vol. 39, pages 57–66. Refereed  Nat.
 Bower, Ursula Graham.1952. Naga Path. London: Reader Union, John Murray.
 Bower, Ursula Graham.1950. Drums Behind the Hill. New York: William Morrow and Company.
 Bower, Ursula Graham.1950.Village Organisation among the Central Nzemi Nagas, Diploma in Anthropology Thesis. London: University College London.

References

www.nambon.com - Zeliangrong community information gap

Naga people